Thor DM-21 Agena-D or just Thor-Agena was an orbital launch vehicle. The launch vehicles used the Douglas-built Thor first stage and the Lockheed-built Agena second stages. They are thus cousins of the more-famous Thor-Deltans, which founded the Delta launch vehicle family. The first attempted launch of a Thor DM-21 Agena-D was on 28 June 1962. The first successful launch was also on 28 June 1962, launching FTV 1151. It was the first two-stage rocket to place a satellite into orbit.

Launch statistics

Launch history

References 

Lists of Thor and Delta launches
Lists of Thor launches
Lists of rocket launches